The following elections occurred in the year 1992.

Africa
 1992 Angolan general election
 1992 Burkinabé parliamentary election
 1992 Cameroonian parliamentary election
 1992 Cameroonian presidential election
 1992 Central African Republic general election
 1992 Comorian legislative election
 1992 Republic of the Congo presidential election
 1992 Djiboutian parliamentary election
 1992 Gambian general election
 1992 Ghanaian parliamentary election
 1992 Ghanaian presidential election
 1992 Kenyan general election
 1992–1993 Malagasy presidential election
 1992 Malawian general election
 1992 Malian parliamentary election
 1992 Malian presidential election
 1992 Mauritanian parliamentary election
 1992 Mauritanian presidential election
 1992 Nigerian parliamentary election
 1992 Republic of the Congo parliamentary election
 1992 Seychellois constitutional commission election
 1992 South African apartheid referendum

Asia
 1992 Azerbaijani presidential election
 1992 Indian presidential election
 1992 Indonesian legislative election
 1992 Iranian legislative election
 1992 Israeli legislative election
 1992 Japanese House of Councillors election
 1992 Kurdistan Region legislative election
 1992 Kuwaiti general election
 1992 Laotian parliamentary election
 1992 Philippine House of Representatives elections
 1992 Philippine Sangguniang Kabataan election
 1992 Philippine Senate election
 1992 Philippine general election
 1992 Philippine presidential election
 1992 Republic of China legislative election
 1992 South Korean legislative election
 1992 South Korean presidential election
 March 1992 Thai general election

Australia
 1992 Alexandra state by-election
 1992 Australian Capital Territory general election
 1992 Davidson state by-election
 1992 Kavel state by-election
 1992 Queensland state election
 1992 Tasmanian state election
 1992 Victorian state election
 1992 Western Australian daylight saving referendum
 1992 Wills by-election

Europe
 1992 Austrian presidential election
 1992 Azerbaijani presidential election
 Croatia:
 1992 Croatian parliamentary election
 1992 Croatian presidential election
 1992 Czechoslovak parliamentary election was held in Czechoslovakia in June 1992, alongside elections for the Czech and Slovak Assemblies
 1992 Czech legislative election
 1992 Speaker of the Czech National Council election 
 1992 Civic Democratic Party leadership election (winner: Václav Klaus) 
 1992 Czechoslovak presidential election (from July to October 1992)
 1992 Estonian parliamentary election
 1992 Fianna Fáil leadership election
 France
 1992 Alsace regional election
 1992 Brittany regional election
 1992 French Maastricht Treaty referendum
 1992 French regional elections
 1992 French cantonal elections
 1992 Gibraltar general election
 1992 Irish general election
 1992 Italian general election
 1992 Lithuanian parliamentary election
 1992 Maltese general election
 Montenegro: 
 1992 Montenegrin parliamentary election
 1992 Montenegrin presidential election
 1992 Romanian presidential election
 Serbia:
 1992 Serbian constitutional referendum
 1992 Serbian parliamentary election
 1992 Serbian presidential election
 1992 Slovak parliamentary election
 Spain: 1992 Catalan parliamentary election

United Kingdom
 1992 United Kingdom general election
 1992 Labour Party leadership election
 1992 Scottish District local elections

United Kingdom local
 1992 United Kingdom local elections

English local
 1992 Bristol City Council elections
 1992 Manchester Council election
 1992 Trafford Council election
 1992 Wolverhampton Council election

United Kingdom general
 1992 United Kingdom general election
 1992 United Kingdom general election result in Essex
 List of MPs elected in the 1992 United Kingdom general election
 List of United Kingdom Parliament constituencies (1983–1997)
 List of United Kingdom Parliament constituencies (1983–1997) by region
 Sheffield Rally
 It's The Sun Wot Won It
 War of Jennifer's Ear

Japan
 1992 Japanese House of Councillors election

North America

Canada
 1992 Edmonton municipal election
 1992 Manitoba municipal elections
 1992 Winnipeg municipal election
 1992 Yukon general election

Caribbean
 1992 Bahamian general election
 1992 Caymanian general election
 1992 Puerto Rican general election
 1992 Saint Lucian general election
 Tobago House of Assembly election
 1992 United States Virgin Islands gambling referendum

United States
 1992 United States presidential election
 1992 United States Senate elections
 1992 United States House of Representatives elections
 1992 United States gubernatorial elections

United States gubernatorial
 1992 Delaware gubernatorial election
 1992 United States gubernatorial elections
 1992 Utah gubernatorial election
 1992 Washington gubernatorial election

Alabama
 United States Senate election in Alabama, 1992
 United States presidential election in Alabama, 1992

Alaska
 United States Senate election in Alaska, 1992

Arizona
 United States Senate election in Arizona, 1992

Arkansas
 United States Senate election in Arkansas, 1992

California
 1992 California State Assembly elections
 1992 California state elections
 1992 California State Senate elections
 United States House of Representatives elections in California, 1992
 United States Senate election in California, 1992
 United States Senate special election in California, 1992
 United States presidential election in California, 1992

Colorado
 United States Senate election in Colorado, 1992

Connecticut
 United States Senate election in Connecticut, 1992

Delaware
 1992 Delaware gubernatorial election

Florida
 United States Senate election in Florida, 1992

Georgia (U.S. state)
 United States Senate election in Georgia, 1992
 United States presidential election in Georgia, 1992

Hawaii
 United States Senate election in Hawaii, 1992

Idaho
 United States Senate election in Idaho, 1992

Illinois
 United States Senate election in Illinois, 1992

Indiana
 United States Senate election in Indiana, 1992
 United States presidential election in Indiana, 1992

Iowa
 Iowa Democratic caucuses, 1992
 United States Senate election in Iowa, 1992

Louisiana
 United States presidential election in Louisiana, 1992

Maryland
 United States Senate election in Maryland, 1992

Missouri
 1992 United States Senate election in Missouri
 United States presidential election in Missouri, 1992

Nevada
 United States Senate election in Nevada, 1992

New Hampshire
 New Hampshire Democratic primary, 1992
 United States Senate election in New Hampshire, 1992

New York
 United States Senate election in New York, 1992

North Carolina
 United States Senate election in North Carolina, 1992
 United States presidential election in North Carolina, 1992

North Dakota
 United States Senate election in North Dakota, 1992
 United States Senate special election in North Dakota, 1992

Ohio
 United States Senate election in Ohio, 1992

Oklahoma
 United States Senate election in Oklahoma, 1992

Oregon
 United States Senate election in Oregon, 1992

Pennsylvania
 United States Senate election in Pennsylvania, 1992

South Carolina
 United States House of Representatives elections in South Carolina, 1992
 United States Senate election in South Carolina, 1992

South Dakota
 United States Senate election in South Dakota, 1992

Texas
 1992 Texas general election

United States House of Representatives
 United States House of Representatives elections in California, 1992
 United States House of Representatives elections in South Carolina, 1992
 1992 United States House of Representatives elections

United States Senate
 1992 United States Senate elections
 United States Senate election in Alabama, 1992
 United States Senate election in Alaska, 1992
 United States Senate election in Arizona, 1992
 United States Senate election in Arkansas, 1992
 United States Senate election in California, 1992
 United States Senate special election in California, 1992
 United States Senate election in Colorado, 1992
 United States Senate election in Connecticut, 1992
 United States Senate election in Florida, 1992
 United States Senate election in Georgia, 1992
 United States Senate election in Idaho, 1992
 United States Senate election in Illinois, 1992
 United States Senate election in Indiana, 1992
 United States Senate election in Iowa, 1992
 United States Senate election in Maryland, 1992
 1992 United States Senate election in Missouri
 United States Senate election in Nevada, 1992
 United States Senate election in New Hampshire, 1992
 United States Senate election in New York, 1992
 United States Senate election in North Carolina, 1992
 United States Senate election in North Dakota, 1992
 United States Senate special election in North Dakota, 1992
 United States Senate election in Ohio, 1992
 United States Senate election in Oklahoma, 1992
 United States Senate election in Oregon, 1992
 United States Senate election in Pennsylvania, 1992
 United States Senate election in South Carolina, 1992
 United States Senate election in South Dakota, 1992
 United States Senate election in Utah, 1992
 United States Senate election in Vermont, 1992
 United States Senate election in Washington, 1992
 United States Senate election in Wisconsin, 1992

Utah
 United States Senate election in Utah, 1992
 United States presidential election in Utah, 1992
 1992 Utah gubernatorial election

Vermont
 United States Senate election in Vermont, 1992

Washington (U.S. state)
 United States Senate election in Washington, 1992
 1992 Washington gubernatorial election

West Virginia
 1992 West Virginia gubernatorial election

Wisconsin
 United States Senate election in Wisconsin, 1992

Oceania
 1992 Fijian general election
 1992 Nauruan parliamentary election
 1992 Palauan general election
 1992 Papua New Guinean general election

Australia
 1992 Alexandra state by-election
 1992 Australian Capital Territory general election
 1992 Davidson state by-election
 1992 Kavel state by-election
 1992 Queensland state election
 1992 Tasmanian state election
 1992 Victorian state election
 1992 Western Australian daylight saving referendum
 1992 Wills by-election

Hawaii
 United States Senate election in Hawaii, 1992

South America
 1992 Ecuadorian general election

See also

 
1992
Elections